Victor David Brenner (born Avigdor David Brenner; June 12, 1871 – April 5, 1924) was an Lithuanian sculptor, engraver, and medalist known primarily as the designer of the United States Lincoln Cent.

Biography
Brenner was born to Jewish parents in Šiauliai, Russian Empire. His name at birth was Avigdor David Brenner ("Avigdor ben Gershon," in Hebrew, as his gravestone attests), but he changed the name to Victor David Brenner.

He emigrated to the United States in 1890, living mostly in the New York City area.  When Brenner arrived in America, he had little more to fall back upon except the trade taught to him by his father — gem and seal engraving.  This technical preparation included the tools of the sculptor's craft.  He took night classes at Cooper Union.  Brenner soon mastered English as he had mastered French.

Eight years later Brenner was in Paris, studying with the great French medalist Oscar Roty at the Académie Julian.  There he exhibited his work and obtained awards at the Paris Exposition of 1900.  He returned to the United States, and from that time on his career prospered.  He appeared to be on his way to the fulfilment of the splendid predictions made for his future by Rodin.

Brenner died in 1924 and is buried at Mount Judah Cemetery, Ridgewood, Queens, New York.

Lincoln cent 

Brenner is probably best known for his enduring Lincoln coin design, the obverse of which is the longest-running design in United States Mint history, and perhaps the most reproduced piece of art in world history.  Brenner's design had been picked by President Theodore Roosevelt, who had earlier posed for him in New York.  Since arriving nineteen years earlier in the United States, Brenner had become one of the nation's premier medalists.  Roosevelt had learned of Brenner's talents in a settlement house on New York City's Lower East Side and was immediately impressed with a bas-relief that Brenner had made of Lincoln, based on the early Civil War era photographer, Mathew Brady's photograph.

Roosevelt, who considered Lincoln the savior of the Union, the greatest Republican president and also considered himself Lincoln's political heir, ordered the new Lincoln penny to be based on Brenner's work and that it be produced to commemorate Lincoln's 100th birthday in 1909.  The likeness of President Lincoln on the obverse of the coin is an adaptation of a plaque Brenner executed several years earlier and which had come to the attention of President Roosevelt in New York.

Bronze bas-reliefs dated 1907 and signed by Brenner have been identified and some sold in auctions for as much as $3,900.

Charles Eliot Norton of Harvard, whom Brenner counted among his friends, gave the sculptor an unpublished portrait of Lincoln which served Brenner as a basis for Lincoln's features.  He also examined other portraits.

When Brenner forwarded the model of the Lincoln cent to the Director of the Mint, the design bore his whole name, after the fashion of the signatures on the coinage of other countries, notably on the gold coins which Oscar Roty designed for France.  The Director, however, decided to have the initials substituted for the name.

Following the precedent of James B. Longacre, whose initials "JBL" (or simply "L") graced a number of U.S. coin designs for much of the latter half of the 19th century, Brenner placed his initials "VDB" at the bottom of the reverse between the wheat ear stalks.

Widespread criticism of the initials' prominence resulted in their removal midway through 1909, the design's first year of issue.  In 1918, Brenner's initials returned as small letters below Lincoln's shoulder, where they remain today.  (The incorporation of the designer's initials into a coin design is now commonplace in the U.S.)

A 1909 VDB US cent was mounted on the calibration target on the Mars Curiosity rover. This is a nod to the rover's geologic mission and the common practice by geologists including a coin in photographs to document the size of objects.

Works
Some of Brenner's most noteworthy sculptural works include: 
 Rev. Dr Muhlenberg Medal (issued by the American Numismatic and Archaeological Society)
 Portrait-plaquette of Fridtjof Nansen
 Portrait medallion of J. Sanford Saltus
 Portrait medallion of C. Delacour
 Portrait-plaquette of Abraham Lincoln (the same plaquette that was used in the design of the Lincoln cent)
 Portrait medallion of Prince Heinrich of Prussia (1902)
 Portrait bas-relief of John Paul Jones
 Portrait bas-relief of Carl Schurz
 Bust of Charles Eliot Norton
 Seal of the New York Public Library
 Portrait of Spencer Trask.
 A Song to Nature in Schenley Plaza at the University of Pittsburgh

See also 
 List of Saltus Award winners

Gallery

References

External links

 
 PCGS The Professional Coin Grading Service's biography of Victor David Brenner
 Leonard Forrer, Biographical Dictionary of Medallists (Vol 1, 1904) pp. 277–279

1871 births
1924 deaths
People from Šiauliai
People from Shavelsky Uyezd
Jews from the Russian Empire
Jewish sculptors
Emigrants from the Russian Empire to the United States
American people of Lithuanian-Jewish descent
20th-century American sculptors
20th-century male artists
19th-century American sculptors
19th-century male artists
American male sculptors
Cooper Union alumni
American medallists
American currency designers
Coin designers
Sculptors from the Russian Empire